David Common is a Canadian journalist, best known as a correspondent and anchor for CBC News, and cohost with Asha Tomlinson and Charlsie Agro of CBC Television's consumer affairs newsmagazine Marketplace.

He was born in Winnipeg, Manitoba and grew up in Toronto, Ontario where he attended Jarvis Collegiate Institute and York University. He studied International Security Issues at Stockholm University in Sweden.

Common has worked for CTV News and CBC News. He began with the CBC at the London bureau, moving later to Toronto, Fredericton, Regina and eventually back to Toronto as a national reporter before being posted to Paris, France in 2006. From France, he travelled extensively in western and eastern Europe and north Africa, shooting and editing his own stories.

In 2009, he was transferred to New York where he worked as the CBC's correspondent in that city, though he covered the 2010 Haiti earthquake, and VE Day 65th anniversary celebrations in the Netherlands. Common has filed reports from across Canada, the United States and Europe, as well as helped cover conflicts in Haiti, Afghanistan and Iraq. He was the main weekday anchor of CBC Radio One's morning newscast World Report for a number of years in the 2010s.

During the COVID-19 pandemic in Canada, he was a guest host for several weeks on Metro Morning, CBC Radio's local morning show on CBLA-FM in Toronto. 

He has received several awards, and was nominated for a Gemini Award twice in the Best Reportage category, winning once.

References 

Canadian television reporters and correspondents
Living people
Canadian radio news anchors
CBC Radio hosts
People from Winnipeg
Journalists from Manitoba
Journalists from Toronto
21st-century Canadian journalists
Year of birth missing (living people)
CBC Television people